Members of the New South Wales Legislative Council who served from 1920 to 1922 were appointed for life by the Governor on the advice of the Premier. This list includes members between the election on 20 March 1920 and the election on 25 March 1922. The President was Fred Flowers.

See also
Storey ministry
First Dooley ministry
First Fuller ministry
Second Dooley ministry

Notes

References

 

Members of New South Wales parliaments by term
20th-century Australian politicians